Gray is an unincorporated community and census-designated place (CDP) in Blair County, Pennsylvania, United States. It was first listed as a CDP prior to the 2020 census.

The CDP is in northern Blair County, in the southern part of Snyder Township. It is on the southeastern side of the valley of the Little Juniata River, between Interstate 99 to the southeast and the Pittsburgh Line of the Norfolk Southern Railway to the northwest.

Demographics

References 

Census-designated places in Blair County, Pennsylvania
Census-designated places in Pennsylvania